Pascal Tayot  (born March 15, 1965 in Gennevilliers, Hauts-de-Seine) is a retired judoka from France. He claimed the silver medal in the Men's Middleweight (– 86 kg) division at the 1992 Summer Olympics in Barcelona, Spain. In the final he was defeated by Poland's Waldemar Legień.

External links
 

1965 births
Living people
People from Gennevilliers
French male judoka
Judoka at the 1988 Summer Olympics
Judoka at the 1992 Summer Olympics
Olympic judoka of France
Olympic silver medalists for France
Olympic medalists in judo
Medalists at the 1992 Summer Olympics
Mediterranean Games gold medalists for France
Competitors at the 1993 Mediterranean Games
Sportspeople from Hauts-de-Seine
Mediterranean Games medalists in judo
20th-century French people